Irma Lozano (24 August 1943 – 21 October 2013) was a Mexican actress. She appeared in more than twenty soap operas.

Selected filmography

References

External links 

1944 births
2013 deaths
Mexican television actresses
Deaths from salivary gland cancer